The Kalisz andruts (Polish: andruty kaliskie), also simply known as andruts (Polish: andruty), are lightly sweet, flat wafers first recorded to be baked at the beginning of the nineteenth-century in Kalisz and the Kalisz Region. 

Since 9 December 2005 adruts are enlisted on the list of traditional produce by the Ministry of Agriculture and Rural Development. Since April 21, 2009 andruty kaliskie have been placed on the European Union's Geographical Indications and Traditional Specialities list.

References

Polish cuisine
Kalisz
Greater Poland
Bakers' confectionery
Polish products with protected designation of origin